McKee is a surname. It may also refer to:

Place names
In Canada:
 McKee Creek (British Columbia)

In the United States:
 McKee, Kentucky, a city
 McKee, Oregon, an unincorporated community
 McKee, Pennsylvania, a census-designated place
 McKee Township, Adams County, Illinois
 McKee Creek (West Virginia)
 McKee Run or Creek, Pennsylvania

Other uses
 , four United States Navy ships
 McKee Foods, an American company
 McKee field, an oil and gas producing field in Taranaki, New Zealand
 McKee power station, a power station in Taranaki, New Zealand
 McKee Barracks, Dublin, Ireland
 McKee Botanical Garden, Vero Beach, Florida, United States, on the National Register of Historic Places
 McKee Bridge, Oregon, United States, on the National Register of Historic Places
 McKee (VTA), a light rail station operated by Santa Clara Valley Transportation Authority
 The Trans-Canada Trophy, an aviation award often referred to as the "McKee Trophy"

See also
 McKee City, New Jersey, an unincorporated community
 McKey (disambiguation)